Štodra is a village in the municipality of Ulcinj, Montenegro. It is located at the Bojana, the border river with Albania.

Demographics
According to the 2011 census, its population was 112, all of them Albanians.

References

Populated places in Ulcinj Municipality
Albanian communities in Montenegro